Abraham William Serfaty CBE, JP, was a Gibraltarian architect and politician.

Biography 
Born in 1910, Abraham William Serfaty was a draughtsman of the Gibraltar City Council when he received an invitation to work for Messrs Pearson Mechanical and Civil Engineers in the UK. While in England, he completed his studies in civil engineering.

Returning to the Rock, Serfaty worked as an architect and later joined the AACR of Sir Joshua Hassan. He ran for the Legislative Council in 1950 but was not elected. However, he became part of the Executive Council, initially as an "unofficial member". In the Legislative Council elections of 1956, he was one of four AACR members elected, the others being Joshua Hassan, Albert Risso, and J. E. Alcantara.

He served at first as Member or Minister for Medical Services, then as Minister for Tourism, and finally as Minister for Economic Development in successive AACR Governments until his retirement in 1984.

Between 1979 and 1988 he served as Mayor of Gibraltar.

In 1980, he became Commander of the Order of the British Empire in recognition for public services in Gibraltar.

References

External links 
 The Self-Determination For Gibraltar Group

1910 births
20th-century deaths
Association for the Advancement of Civil Rights politicians
Gibraltarian Jews
Jewish Gibraltarian politicians
Mayors of Gibraltar
Members of the Order of the British Empire